The Nilgiri Biosphere Reserve is a biosphere reserve in the Nilgiri Mountains of the Western Ghats in South India. It is the largest protected forest area in India, spreading across Tamil Nadu, Karnataka and Kerala. It includes the protected areas Mudumalai National Park, Mukurthi National Park, Sathyamangalam Wildlife Sanctuary in Tamil Nadu; Nagarhole National Park, Bandipur National Park, both in Karnataka; Silent Valley National Park, Aralam Wildlife Sanctuary, Wayanad Wildlife Sanctuary, and Karimpuzha Wildlife Sanctuary in Kerala.

An ecosystem of the hill ranges of Nilgiris and its surrounding environments covering a tract of over 5000 square kilometers was constituted as Nilgiris Biosphere Reserve by UNESCO in September 1986 under Man and Biosphere Programme. Nilgiris Biosphere Reserve is India's first and foremost biosphere reserves with a heritage, rich in flora and fauna. Tribal groups such as the Badagas, Toda, Kotas, Irulla, Kurumba, Paniya, Adiyan, Edanadan Chettis, Allar, and Malayan are native to the reserve. India's natural gold fields, the Kolar Gold Fields, are also located in the regions in and around Nilgiris Biosphere Reserve scattered in the states of Karnataka, Kerala, and Tamil Nadu.

Etymology
The word Nilgiri is derived from the Kannada /   Malayalam word neeli or neela meaning blue and giri meaning mountain.

History 
Nilgiri Biosphere Reserve was established in September 1986 and is India's first biosphere reserve under UNESCO's Man and the Biosphere Programme.

Geography

The reserve extends from the tropical and subtropical moist broadleaf forests, tropical moist forests of the western slopes of the Ghats to the tropical and subtropical dry broadleaf forests tropical dry forests on the east slopes. The reserve encompasses three ecoregions, the South Western Ghats moist deciduous forests, South Western Ghats montane rain forests, and South Deccan Plateau dry deciduous forests.

Flora

Nilgiri Biosphere Reserve harbours more than 3,700 plant species, including about 200 medicinal plants; the 132 endemic flowering plants are contained in the list of endemic plants in the Nilgiri Biosphere Reserve.
Stunted evergreen trees grow in shola forest patches above  and are festooned with epiphytes.

During the peak flowering season from January to May, at least 73 species blossom including teak (Tectona grandis), red cedar (Erythroxylum monogynum), hiptage (Hiptage benghalensis), large-flowered bay tree (Persea macrantha), zunna berry (Ziziphus rugosa) and creeping smartweed (Persicaria chinensis). They depend on pollination by giant honey bee, Asiatic honey bee (Apis cerana), red dwarf honey bee (A. florea) and Trigona bees.

Fauna

Birds 

Nilgiri Biosphere Reserve harbours 14 bird species that are endemic to the Western Ghats. Of these, the Nilgiri laughingthrush (Strophocincla cachinnans) inhabits only higher elevations above . Other endemics and near-endemics include Nilgiri wood-pigeon, Malabar grey hornbill, Malabar parakeet, white-bellied treepie, white-bellied shortwing, grey-headed bulbul, grey-breasted laughingthrush, rufous babbler, black-and-rufous flycatcher, Nilgiri flycatcher, and Nilgiri pipit.

Mammals 

Nilgiri Biosphere Reserve and adjacent areas host the largest Asian elephant (Elephas maximus) population in India, estimated at 5,750 individuals by 2007. Herds move in  large home ranges and congregate at perennial water sources during the dry season.

Fauna includes over 100 species of mammals, 370 species of birds, 80 species of reptiles, about 39 species of fish, 31 amphibians and 316 species of butterflies. It is home to mammals such as the Bengal tiger, Indian leopard, chital deer, gaur, sambar deer, dhole, golden jackal, Indian boar, Nilgiri tahr, Indian spotted chevrotain, black buck, Asian palm civet, sloth bear, four-horned antelope, Nilgiri marten, Indian crested porcupine, Malabar giant squirrel, honey badger, Indian grey mongoose, Indian pangolin, Indian fox, smooth coated otter, and painted bat. Primates include the lion tailed macaque, Nilgiri langur, gray langur and bonnet macaque.

Amphibians and reptiles 
Amphibians include purple frog,  Silent valley brush frog, Malabar gliding frog, Beddomixalus. Around fifty percent of India's amphibian species are endemic to the region, and around ninety species of reptiles including the genera Brachyopihidium, Dravidogecko, Melanophidum, Ristella, Salea, Plectrurus, Teretrurus, and Xylophis.

Threats

Shola forests outside protected areas are threatened by fragmentation, especially in the vicinity of settlements. The rapid and dense growth of the invasive Passiflora mollissima inhibits the regeneration of native tree species in the Shola forest patches.

Poaching, deforestation, forest fires and dangers to native tribes are the main threats. Despite poaching banned by law in 1972, people still tend to illegally hunt animals such as tigers, elephants and chital for skin, fur or tusks. Forests are being destroyed for farming or livestock. Animals that kill livestock are killed by farmers. Forest fires destroy vegetation. Native tribes are being evacuated from their homelands, resulting in loss of tribal culture.

See also
 Indian Council of Forestry Research and Education

References

Protected areas of Kerala
Biosphere reserves of India
Protected areas of Karnataka
Geography of Wayanad district
Geography of Coimbatore
South Deccan Plateau dry deciduous forests
South Western Ghats moist deciduous forests
Wildlife sanctuaries of the Western Ghats
South Western Ghats montane rain forests
Geography of Palakkad district
Protected areas established in 1986
1986 establishments in Karnataka
Tourist attractions in Wayanad district
Tourist attractions in Palakkad district
Indomalayan realm
Montane grasslands and shrublands
Montane ecology
Flora of the Western Ghats